Pittosporum kirkii is a glabrous evergreen perennial shrub that reaches up to  in height and possesses distinctive coriaceous, fleshy, thick leaves. It is one of four shrubs endemic to New Zealand that frequently displays an epiphytic lifestyle. P. kirkii is commonly epiphytic, perched amongst nest epiphytes in the canopies of emergent or canopy trees in old-growth forest; however, it can be observed occasionally growing on the ground or over rocks (in a rupestral lifestyle). Kirk first observed P. kirkii on Great Barrier Island. It was described by Joseph Dalton Hooker from material collected by Thomas Kirk, possibly from the Thames Goldfields, and published in 1869. The initial brief description titled Pittosporum n. sp.? by Thomas Kirk was published in his paper on Great Barrier Island in 1868. This description along with herbarium specimens were sent to Dr. J. D Hooker at Kew Gardens in 1868, and he collaborated to name it after T. Kirk, by giving it the specific epithet kirkii within the publication that was otherwise written by Kirk.

Kirk's (1869) description reads: 
Pittosporum Kirkii, Hook. f., n. sp., A handsome, laxly-branched shrub, 3–15 feet high, branchlets stout, rigid, ascending; bark reddish-purple, leaves alternate, crowded or whorled, linear-obovate, acute or obtuse, 2-5 inches long, gradually narrowed into rather broad purple petioles, excessively coriaceous, glabrous, pale-green above, lighter below, midrib stout, prominent and cuiously flattened beneath; flowers terminal in 3-7 flowered umbels, peduncles rather stout, decurved; sepals broadly lanceolate with membranous margins; petals ligulate, bright yellowe, recurved; capsules erect, clustered, glabrous, elliptic, 1-1 1/2 inches long, obtuse, 2-valved, remarkably compressed, but the valves contract in a curious manner when the capsule bursts.

An illustration in Cheeseman et al. (1914) 1 was the first to highlight the male and female reproductive structures (dioecy) of P. kirkii.

Pittosporum kirkii has a known restricted geographical range in the North Island, extending from Mangonui in Northland (ca. 35o0'1S) to Raetihi and in the Matemateāonga Range south of Ohakune (ca. 39o3'8S) with a mean altitude of 471 (± 0.11) meters above sea level. It is also notably abundant on the offshore islands of Great Barrier and Little Barrier.

Pittosporum kirkii is currently listed as in decline and is nowhere common throughout its range.

References

Flora of New Zealand
kirkii